The public image of Vladimir Putin concerns the image of Vladimir Putin, President of Russia, among residents of Russia and worldwide.

Ratings and polls

Domestic
According to public opinion surveys conducted by NGO Levada Center, Putin's approval rating was just 60% in July 2020. Putin's popularity rose from 31% in August 1999 to 80% in November 1999, never dropping below 65% during his first presidency.Observers see Putin's high approval ratings as a consequence of the significant improvements in living standards and Russia's reassertion of itself on the world scene that has occurred during his period of office. One analysis attributed Putin's popularity, in part, to state-owned or state-controlled television.

A joint poll by World Public Opinion in the US and Levada Center  in Russia around June–July 2006 stated that "neither the Russian nor the American publics are convinced Russia is headed in an anti-democratic direction" and "Russians generally support Putin's concentration of political power and strongly support the re-nationalization of Russia's oil and gas industry." Russians generally support the political course of Putin and his team. A 2005 survey showed that three times as many Russians felt the country was "more democratic" under Putin than it was during the Yeltsin or Gorbachev years, and the same proportion thought human rights were better under Putin than Yeltsin.

In January 2013, at the time of 2011–2013 Russian protests, Putin's approval rating fell to 62%, the lowest figure since 2000 and a ten-point drop over two years. By May 2014, following the annexation of Crimea, Putin's approval rating had rebounded to 85.9%, a six-year high.

After EU and U.S. sanctions against Russian officials as a result of the 2014 Russian invasion of Ukraine, Putin's approval rating reached 87 percent, according to a Levada Center survey published on 6 August 2014. In February 2015, based on new domestic polling, Putin was ranked the world's most popular politician. In June 2015, Putin's approval rating climbed to 89%, an all-time high. In 2016, the approval rating was 81%.

Despite high approval for Putin, confidence in the Russian economy is low, dropping to levels in 2016 that rivaled the recent lows in 2009 at the height of the global economic crisis. Just 14% of Russians in 2016 said their national economy was getting better, and 18% said this about their local economies. Putin's performance at reining in corruption is also unpopular among Russians. Newsweek reported in June 2017 that "An opinion poll by the Moscow-based Levada Center indicated that 67 percent held Putin personally responsible for high-level corruption".

In July 2018, Putin's approval rating fell to 63% and just 49% would vote for Putin if presidential elections were held.  Levada poll results published in September 2018 showed  Putin's personal trustworthiness levels at 39% (decline from 59% in November 2017) with the main contributing factor being the presidential support of the unpopular pension reform and  economic stagnation. In October 2018, two thirds of Russians surveyed in Levada poll agreed that "Putin bears full responsibility for the problems of the country", which has been attributed to decline of a popular belief in "good tsar and bad boyars", a traditional attitude towards justifying failures of the ruling hierarchy in Russia.

In May 2020, Putin's approval rating dropped to a historic low of 59% in an April poll by the Levada Center.

In December 2021, a Levada Center poll found that 65% approved of Putin personally, That jumped to 69% who had a positive view of Putin in January 2022, and 71% who approved of the Russian president in February 2022 (before the 2022 Russian invasion of Ukraine).

International
According to a 2017 survey by the Worldwide Independent Network/Gallup International Association (WIN/GIA), Putin's international reputation increased significantly between 2015 and 2017 (43% favorable in 2017 compared with 33% in 2015).

Some of these views have changed considerably over time ever since 2017. For instance, in Romania, in a 2022 poll, only 3% of Romanians had a positive opinion of Putin while 70% of Romanians had a negative one.

Assessments
Putin was Time magazine's Person of the Year for 2007. In April 2008, Putin was put on the Time 100 most influential people in the world list.

On 4 December 2007, at Harvard University, former Soviet leader Mikhail Gorbachev credited Putin with having "pulled Russia out of chaos" and said he was "assured a place in history", despite Gorbachev's claim that the news media have been suppressed and that election rules run counter to the democratic ideals he has promoted. In December 2011, amid the protests following the 2011 Russian elections Gorbachev criticized Putin for a decision to seek the third term in the presidential elections and advised Putin to leave politics.

Criticism of Putin has been widespread especially over the Runet. It is said that the Russian youth organisations finance a full "network" of pro-government bloggers.

In the U.S. embassy cables, published by WikiLeaks in late 2010, Putin was called "alpha dog" and compared with Batman (while Dmitry Medvedev was compared with Batman's crime-fighting partner Robin). American diplomats said Putin's Russia had become "a corrupt, autocratic kleptocracy centred on the leadership of Putin, in which officials, oligarchs and organised crime are bound together to create a "virtual mafia state." Putin called it "slanderous".

By western commentators and the Russian opposition, Putin has been described as a dictator.  Putin biographer Masha Gessen has stated that "Putin is a dictator," comparing him to Alexander Lukashenko. Former UK Foreign Secretary David Miliband has described Putin as a "ruthless dictator" whose "days are numbered." U.S. Presidential candidate Mitt Romney called Putin "a real threat to the stability and peace of the world."

In the fall of 2011, the anti-Putin opposition movement in Russia became more visible, with street protests against allegedly falsified parliamentary elections (in favor of Putin's party, United Russia) cropping up across major Russian cities. Following Putin's re-election in March 2012, the movement struggled to redefine its new course of action. In early September 2014 Patriarch Filaret, head of the Ukrainian Orthodox Church of the Kyivan Patriarchate, linked Putin with the biblical figure Cain because Filaret believed that although Putin claimed to be their “brother”, he was responsible for "shedding the brotherly blood" of Ukrainians during the War in Donbass. Filaret believed "Satan went into him, as into Judas Iscariot". The Dalai Lama criticized Putin's foreign policy practices, claiming it to be responsible for isolating Russia from the rest of the world. The Organized Crime and Corruption Reporting Project named Putin as the 2014 Person of the Year, recognizing "the person who does the most to enable and promote organized criminal activity."

According to Denis Volkov from Moscow Levada Center, drawing any conclusions from Russian poll results or comparing them with Western polls is pointless as there's no real political competition in Russia. Unlike in democratic states, the Russian voters aren't offered any "credible alternatives" and the public opinion is formed primarily with state-controlled media which promotes the ruling party and discredits any alternative candidates. This kind of illusion of democracy, choice only between "A and A", is part of "Russian consciousness", according to a nationalist publicist Alexander Prokhanov, who considers the "elections between A and B" to be part of a "liberal" mindset.

Brands
Putin's name and image are widely used in advertisements and product branding. Among Putin-branded products are Putinka vodka, the PuTin brand of canned food, Gorbusha Putina caviar, and a collection of T-shirts with his image. In October 2016, the luxury company, Caviar, produced a limited series of iPhone 7s made from Damascus steel called Supremo Putin Damascus. It features a golden bas-relief portrait of Putin.

Public image

Putin has created a cult of personality for himself as an outdoorsy, sporty, tough guy public image, demonstrating his physical capabilities and taking part in unusual or dangerous acts, such as extreme sports and interaction with wild animals. For example, in 2007, the tabloid Komsomolskaya Pravda published a huge photograph of a bare-chested Putin vacationing in the Siberian mountains under the headline: "Be Like Putin." Such photo ops are part of a public relations approach that, according to Wired, "deliberately cultivates the macho, take-charge superhero image". The British tabloid Daily Express has commented that this cultivated image runs counter to the reality of Putin's modest physical stature, his height being officially reported as 170 cm (5'7"), and some of the activities used to promote his virile prowess have been criticized for involving deception or being completely staged. Notable examples of Putin's macho adventures include:

Putin flew in a Sukhoi Su-27 fighter over Chechnya in 2000 and a Tu-160 supersonic heavy bomber on 16 August 2005 at MAKS Airshow.
Martial arts – Putin demonstrated his martial art skills on a tatami at the Kodokan Institute in Tokyo on 5 September 2000 and has subsequently made further demonstrations. Putin currently holds a black belt in Judo. Putin had also been awarded a 9th Dan belt in Taekwondo before it was rescinded in February 2022.
Adventures in the wild – On his trip to Tuva in August 2007, Putin was seen riding horses, rafting, fishing and swimming in a cold Siberian river (mostly bare-chested). In August 2009, Putin repeated the experience. In 2008, Putin visited the Ussuri national park, where he sedated an Amur tiger with a tranquiliser gun and then helped measure its teeth and fit it with a tracker. Claims were made later that the tiger was actually from the Khabarovsk Zoo and that it died soon after the stunt, but the suspected tiger named by the Khabarovsk Zoo workers was found in late 2009 in Zelenogorsk, while the claims of a stunt were denied by the scientists who organized the "safari". In April 2010, Putin traveled to Franz Josef Land in the Russian Arctic, where he tranquilized a polar bear and attached a satellite tag to it. In late August 2010, Putin shot darts from a crossbow at a gray whale off Kamchatka Peninsula coast as part of an eco-tracking effort, while balancing on a rubber boat in the sea.
Descending in a deepwater submersible – On 1 August 2009, Putin descended 1395 m to the bottom of Lake Baikal, the world's deepest lake, on a MIR submersible accompanied by deepwater explorer Anatoly Sagalevich (who had been among the team which had reached the bottom at the North Pole in the Arktika 2007 expedition). From the bottom of Baikal Putin spoke to journalists via hydrophone.
Riding a motorbike – In July 2010, Putin appeared at a bikers festival in Sevastopol riding a Harley-Davidson tricycle; the high council of Russian bikers movements unanimously voted him into a Hells Angel rank with the nickname of Abaddon. Putin's associations with motorcycle gangs led to him being accidentally placed on a blacklist of banned people in Finland. In August 2011 a video showed Putin riding with the Night Wolves.
Firefighting from the air – In August 2010, Russian TV broadcast a video of Putin co-piloting a firefighting plane Beriev Be-200 to dump water on a raging fire during the 2010 Russian wildfires.

Driving a race car – Putin tested a Formula 1 car on 7 November 2010 in Saint Petersburg, reaching a maximum speed of 240 km per hour (149 mph).
Scuba diving – Putin took part in scuba diving at the archaeological site of the ancient Greek colony of Phanagoria in the Taman Bay on 11 August 2011. During the dive, he "discovered" two amphorae and emerged from the sea exclaiming to television cameras "Treasure!". In October 2011, spokesman Dmitry Peskov told media: "Putin did not find the amphorae on the sea bed that had been lying there for thousands of years [...] They were found during an [archaeological] expedition several weeks or days beforehand. Of course they were then left there [for him to find] or placed there. It is a completely normal thing to do." The New Republic called it an example of Putin Jumping the shark.
In September 2012, Putin flew in a motorized hang glider alongside endangered Siberian white cranes to "guide them on their migration to Asia."
Fishing – In July 2013, Putin was pictured in Tuva, Siberia, holding up a large pike that he 'caught' and which the Kremlin claimed weighed 21 kg (47 lbs), a very large amount for that species. Many media outlets and internet users questioned whether the fish could have weighed that much. Some bloggers also pointed out that Putin's fishing trip wasn't on the official schedule and that he was photographed wearing clothing identical to that worn during a previous trip to the region.
In a 2014 art exhibition organised by Putin Supporters group on Facebook, and labelled "bizarre" by BBC News, the Russian leader was depicted in the guise of the all-conquering Ancient Greek hero Heracles. The series of images associated each of twelve various military and political feats performed by Putin with one of the mythological figure's famous Twelve Labors.
In August 2015, Putin used a submersible to explore a Byzantine shipwreck off the coast of Crimea. "83 metres is a pretty substantial depth," he said in televised comments after the dive. "It was interesting."
In May 2019, Putin scored 8 goals in an amateur hockey league all-star game and was reportedly provided with plenty of scoring opportunities by his linemates and was met with little resistance by the opposing team's defence.
In April 2021, Putin was named Russia's "most handsome man" in a poll of two thousand conducted by Superjob.ru, a Russian job board site. People from three hundred cities were surveyed. Complex described the selection process as "highly questionable" and emphasized the disproportionate results of the survey.
On 1 September 2022, in Kaliningrad, Putin was appearing to struggle with control of his legs during a conference with Russian school pupils.

Singing and painting

On 11 December 2010, at a concert organized for a children's charity in Saint Petersburg, Putin sang Blueberry Hill with Maceo Parker's jazz band and played a little piano of it and of the Russian patriotic song С чего начинается Родина from his favourite spy movie The Shield and the Sword. After that he took part in singing of a Russian song about cosmonauts, Grass by the Home. The concert was attended by various Hollywood and European stars such as Kevin Costner, Sharon Stone, Alain Delon, and Gérard Depardieu. Putin also played or sang "С чего начинается Родина" on a number of other occasions, such as a meeting with the Russian spies deported from the U.S., including Anna Chapman.
Another melody which Putin is known to play on the piano is the Anthem of Saint Petersburg, his native city.

Putin's painting "Узор на заиндевевшем окне" (A Pattern on a Hoarfrost-Encrusted Window), which he had painted during the Christmas Fair on 26 December 2008, became the top lot at the charity auction in Saint Petersburg and sold for 37 million rubles. The picture was made for a series of other paintings by famous Russians. The painters were required to illustrate one of the letters of the Russian alphabet with a subject connected to Nikolay Gogol's novel Christmas Eve (the 200th anniversary from Gogol's birth was celebrated in 2008). Putin's picture depicted a hoarfrost pattern (Russian: Узор, illustrating the Cyrillic letter У) on a window with curtains sewn with traditional Ukrainian ornaments. The creation of the painting coincided with the 2009 Russia–Ukraine gas dispute, which left a number of European states without Russian gas and amid January frosts.

In popular culture

A Russian movie called A Kiss not for Press was premiered in 2008 on DVD. The movie is said to be based on biography of Vladimir Putin and his wife Lyudmila. Dobby, a house elf from Harry Potter film series, has been found to look like Putin, and so was also Daniel Craig in his role of James Bond (he was the first blond actor to play James Bond).

There are a large number of songs about Putin. These include:

Такого, как Путин – "[I Want] A Man Like Putin" by Singing Together
Гороскоп (Путин, не ссы!) – "Horoscope (Putin, Don't Pee Pee!)" by Uma2rman
ВВП – "VVP" by a Tajik singer Tolibjon Kurbankhanov (Толибджон Курбанханов)
Our Madhouse is Voting for Putin by Rabfak. (Рабфак).
Vladimir - a song by a Polish bard Maleńczuk. The singer said that he planned to release it before the Sochi Olympics, but the Russian annexation of Crimea contributed greatly to the promotion of the song.
Putin khuylo!, a song originated in Ukraine in 2014 having grown from a football chant
Vladimir Putin... – a more recent song by Colin Macpherson; inspired by the war in Ukraine 
Putin - a recent song released in 2022  by Polish singer and producer Cypis denouncing the tragedies of the war after Russia's invasion, gaining tens of millions of views on various social media and trending in many Western and Eastern European countries, including Ukraine.

Putin also is a subject of Russian jokes and chastushki, such as "[Before Putin] There Was No Orgasm" featured in the comedy film The Day of Elections. There is a meta-joke that, since the coming of Putin to power, all the classic jokes about a smart yet rude boy called Вовочка (Vovochka, diminutive from Vladimir) have suddenly become political jokes. 

Putin features in the coloring book for children Vova and Dima (presented on his 59th birthday), where he and Dmitry Medvedev are drawn as good-behaving little boys, and in the Superputin online comics series, where Putin and Medvedev are portrayed first as superheroes, and then as a troll and an orc in the World of Warcraft.

Putin was portrayed by internet personality Nice Peter in  his YouTube series Epic Rap Battles of History, in Season 2's finale episode, "Rasputin vs. Stalin" (aired on 22 April 2013).

In 2014, Putin earned a nickname of "dickhead" or "fuckface" ("хуйло" in Russian and Ukrainian) in Ukraine, following the spread of the chant of Ukrainian football hooligans. On 14 June 2014, Ukraine's acting Foreign Minister Andriy Deshchytsia cited the chant in front of the cameras during an anti-Russian rally at Russia's Embassy in Kyiv.

The main protagonist of 2018 manga series The Ride-On King - Alexander Purchinov - was inspired by Vladimir Putin.

In the wake of the 2022 Russian invasion of Ukraine, leaders at the 48th G7 summit ridiculed Putin's photo ops—particularly his manly, bare-chested photographs with airbrushed muscles—including Boris Johnson.

Putinisms

Putin has produced a large number of popular aphorisms and catch-phrases, known as putinisms. Many of them were first made during his annual Q&A conferences, where Putin answered questions from journalists and other people in the studio, as well as from Russians throughout the country, who either phoned in or spoke from studios and outdoor sites across Russia. Putin is known for his often tough and sharp language. The examples of most popular putinisms include:
 – One of the earliest "putinisms", made in September 1999, when he promised to destroy terrorists wherever they were found, including in toilets. A literal translation is 'to wet them in toilets'. The Russian old-standing criminal slang expression "to wet", however means "to murder". In 2010, Putin also promised to scrape the remaining terrorists out from the bottom of a sewer (выковырять со дна канализации).
 Comrade Wolf - Putin's remark, describing the policies of the United States, many non-Russians found cryptic (Russia's neighbors tend to think this an example of psychological projection by Putin, reflecting instead his own behavior). The phrase comes from the following Russian joke:
 Rabinovich is walking through the forest with a sheep, when both of them stumble into a pit. A few minutes later, a wolf also falls into the pit. The sheep gets nervous and starts bleating. "What's with all the baaahh, baaahh?" Rabinovich asks. "Comrade Wolf knows whom to eat."
She sank. (Она утонула.) – Putin's short answer to a question from Larry King in September 2000 asking what happened to the Russian submarine Kursk (K-141). Many criticized Putin for the cynicism perceived in this answer.
Plowed away like a slave on a galley (Пахал, как раб на галерах) – (The Russian verb пахать also has the general meaning of "to do hard work".) This is how Putin described his work as President of Russia from 2000 to 2008 during a Q&A conference in February 2008. Not only did the phrase itself became popular, but a wrong hearing of it— "как раб" ("like a slave") in Russian sounds almost identical to "как краб" ("like a crab")—led to the appearance of an Internet nickname for Putin, "Crabbe" (Russian: Краббе), while Dmitry Medvedev was similarly nicknamed Shmele (Russian: Шмеле, a non-existent vocative form of шмель, meaning "bumblebee").
Ears of a dead donkey (От мертвого осла уши) – Quoting Ostap Bender from a popular Soviet novel The Little Golden Calf, that was, according to Putin, what Latvia would receive instead of the western Pytalovsky District of Russia claimed by Latvia in a territorial dispute stemming from the Soviet border redrawing. On 27 March 2007 Russia and Latvia signed the treaty on state border, in which Latvia renounced its territorial claims.
At the very least, a civil servant should have a head. (Как минимум государственный деятель должен иметь голову.) – Putin's response to Hillary Clinton's claim that Putin has no soul. He also recommended that international relations be built without emotion and instead on the basis of the fundamental interests of the states involved.

Give my pen back. (Ручку верните.) – A phrase said by Putin to the industrial oligarch Oleg Deripaska, after Deripaska was forced by Putin to sign, using Putin's pen, an agreement aimed at resolving a socioeconomic crisis in the monograd of Pikalyovo on 4 June 2009, which had escalated after the different owners of the aluminum oxide plant and connected enterprises in the town did not pay their workers' salaries and were unable to negotiate the terms on which the local industrial complex would work. Putin came to the scene personally to conduct the negotiations.
Shearing a piglet (Стричь поросенка) – On 25 June 2013, Putin revealed the surveillance whistleblower Edward Snowden was indeed in a Moscow airport, ending a global guessing game over the US fugitive's whereabouts. Putin lashed out at US accusations that Russia was harbouring a fugitive, saying "I'd rather not deal with such questions, because anyway it's like shearing a piglet—a lot of squealing but little wool".
Russia is not the kind of a country that extradites human rights activists. (Россия не та страна, которая выдаёт борцов за права человека.) – This comment on Snowden during the Q&A session with CNBC at the SPIEF on 23 May 2014 was followed by a storm of laughter and applause. Kommersant described the reaction as follows: "A tempest of elation and applause erupted, and a howl of laughter and weeping hung over the hall" ("Поднялась просто буря восторга, аплодисментов, над залом застрял стон из хохота и плача"), and commented that not everybody grasped the full meaning of the utterance.
 "Don't wait for it!", "Don't waste time waiting!" (Не дождетесь!) – Various Russian media noticed that at the 20 December 2018 press conference, when asked about his health, Putin answered with the punch line from a Jewish joke: Old Rabinovich is greeted: "Hi! How is your health?" — "Don't wait for it!" he answers. Putin invoked the same joke at the 23 January 2000 press conference when commenting on the talks about his potential long-term dictatorship.
"Defenseless Russian bomber" ( беззащитный российский бомбардировщик) – This Russian internet meme of late 2015 was in fact a transcription error: Putin was talking about the "unsupported bomber" (bomber without fighter support, незащищенный бомбардировщик) when commenting on the 2015 Russian Sukhoi Su-24 shootdown by a Turkish fighter jet.
"Подхрюкивают" ("podkhryukivayut"), "oinking along" – Uttered during Putin's 2019 "State Of The Nation" address. The context was the American allegations that Russians violate the ABM Treaty. Putin responded that the Americans were first to violate it and "they are also mobilising their satellites that are cautious but still make noises in support of the USA". Here "make noises in support" is the official translation of "podkhryukivayut", while the literal translation would be "oink along"  (in an analogy with "sing along" for "подпевают/подпевать", ("podpevayut"/"podpevat") with a similar  metaphorical meaning). The witticism brought applause from the audience. A number of observers commented on the untranslatability of the word and suggested other translations, such as "grunt along", "take up grunting", or "to echo".

See also
 Putinism
 Russia under Vladimir Putin

References and notes

Vladimir Putin
Cultural depictions of Vladimir Putin
Politics of Russia
History of Russia (1991–present)
Putin, Vladimir
Articles containing video clips
Cults of personality